The S6 is a commuter rail route forming part of the Milan suburban railway service, which converges on the city of Milan, Italy.

The route runs over the infrastructure of the Turin–Milan, Milan Passante and Milan–Venice railways.  Like all the other Milan suburban railway service routes, it is operated by Trenord.

Route 
Line S6, a cross-city route, heads initially in an easterly direction from Novara to Rho Fiera Milano.  From there, it runs through the municipality of Milan, via the Milan Passante railway, to Milano Porta Vittoria, and finally in an easterly direction to Treviglio. The travel takes 1h47'.

History
The S6 was activated on 12 December 2004, and operated initially between Novara and Milano Porta Vittoria.

With the change of timetable on 15 June 2008, the line was extended from Milano Porta Vittoria to Milano Rogoredo, where there is interchange with regional trains and long-distance services to and from Genoa, Bologna and Mantua.

Coinciding with another timetable change on 13 December 2009, the Porta Vittoria to Rogoredo section was closed, but the southern end of the route was extended in that section's place, from Porta Vittoria to Pioltello-Limito (and during rush hour to Treviglio).

Stations 
The stations on the S6 are as follows (stations with blue background are in the municipality of Milan):

Rolling stock 
S6 trains are made up of 5, 6 or 8-car Treno ad alta frequentazione (TAF) or Treno Servizio Regionale (TSR) train sets.

Scheduling 
, S6 trains ran every half-hour between 06:00 and 00:30 daily.

From 07:00 to 09:00, and from 17:00 to 20:00, S6 services cover the entire route between Novara and Treviglio.  During the rest of the day, S6 trains are limited to Novara–Pioltello-Limito, except between 10:00 to 12:00, when the S6 operates only between Novara and Milano Certosa.

See also 

 History of rail transport in Italy
 List of Milan suburban railway stations
 Rail transport in Italy
 Transport in Milan

References

External links
 ATM – official site 
 Trenord – official site 
 Schematic of Line S6 – schematic depicting all stations on Line S6

This article is based upon a translation of the Italian language version as at November 2012.

Milan S Lines